Below are statistics and records related to Galatasaray.

Honours

Domestic competitions
 Süper Lig
 Winners (22): 1961–62, 1962–63, 1968–69, 1970–71, 1971–72, 1972–73, 1986–87, 1987–88, 1992–93, 1993–94, 1996–97, 1997–98, 1998–99, 1999–2000, 2001–02, 2005–06, 2007–08, 2011–12, 2012–13, 2014–15, 2017–18, 2018–19  (record)
 Runners-up (11): 1959, 1960–61, 1965–66, 1974–75, 1978–79, 1985–86, 1990–91, 2000–01, 2002–03, 2013–14, 2020–21
 Turkish Cup
 Winners (18): 1962–63, 1963–64, 1964–65, 1965–66, 1972–73, 1975–76, 1981–82, 1984–85, 1990–91, 1992–93, 1995–96, 1998–99, 1999–2000, 2004–05, 2013–14, 2014–15, 2015–16, 2018–19 (record)
 Runners-up (5): 1968–69, 1979–80, 1993–94, 1994–95, 1997–98
 Turkish Super Cup
 Winners (16): 1966, 1969, 1972, 1982, 1987, 1988, 1991, 1993, 1996, 1997, 2008, 2012, 2013, 2015, 2016, 2019 (record)
 Runners-up (9): 1971, 1973, 1976, 1985, 1994, 1998, 2006, 2014, 2018
 Turkish National Division
 Winners (1): 1939
 Runners-up (5): 1937, 1940, 1941, 1943, 1950
 Turkish Football Championship
 Runners-up (1): 1949
 Atatürk Cup
 Runners-up (1): 2000
 Prime Minister's Cup
 Winners (5): 1975, 1979, 1986, 1990, 1995
 Runners-up (2): 1980, 1989

International competitions
 UEFA Cup
 Winners (1): 1999–2000
 UEFA Super Cup
 Winners (1): 2000

Regional competitions
 Istanbul Football League
 Winners (15): 1908–09, 1909–10, 1910–11, 1914–15, 1915–16, 1921–22, 1924–25, 1925–26, 1926–27, 1928–29, 1930–31, 1948–49, 1954–55, 1955–56, 1957–58 (shared-record)
 Istanbul Football Cup 
 Winners (2): 1941–42, 1942–43 (shared-record)
 Istanbul Shield
 Winners (1): 1932–33

Doubles and Trebles
Doubles
Süper Lig and Turkish Cup: 1962–63, 1972–73, 1998–99, 1999–2000, 2014–15
Domestic trebles
Süper Lig, Turkish Cup and TFF Super Cup: 1992–93, 2018–19
International trebles
Süper Lig, Turkish Cup and UEFA Europa League: 1999–2000

Other
 Turkish Amateur Football Championship
 Winners (1): 1952
 TSYD Cup
 Winners (12): 1963, 1966, 1967, 1970, 1977, 1981, 1987, 1991, 1992, 1997, 1998, 1999 (shared-record)
 Runners-up (9): 1965, 1969, 1971, 1973, 1976, 1979, 1980, 1986, 1991
 Atatürk Gazi Cup
 Winners (1): 1928
 50. Anniversary Cup 
 Winners (1): 1973
 Emirates Cup
 Winners (1): 2013
 Uhrencup
 Winners (1): 2016
 Union Club Cup 
 Winners (1): 1909

Team records

Süper Lig

Wins

Most wins in a Süper Lig season

Most home wins in a Süper Lig season

Most away wins in a Süper Lig season

Most consecutive wins in a Süper Lig season

Most consecutive wins league

Most consecutive home wins league

Most consecutive away wins league

Record wins 
 8–0, Galatasaray – Altınordu, 1959–1960, 24 October 1959
 0–8, Ankaragücü – Galatasaray, 1992–1993, 30 May 1993
 9–2, Galatasaray – Adana Demirspor, 1983–1984, 11 December 1983
 1–8, Altay – Galatasaray, 1996–1997, 27 October 1996
 7–0, Galatasaray – Erzurumspor, 2000–2001, 19 August 2000
 0–7, Karabükspor – Galatasaray, 2017–2018, 3 March 2018
 0–7, İstanbul Başakşehir – Galatasaray, 2017–2018, 12 November 2022

All domestic competitions (Süper Lig, Türkiye Kupası and Süper Kupa)
Most consecutive wins

Record wins before Süper Lig era (—1959)
 20–0, Galatasaray – Vefa, 1925–1926, Istanbul Lig, 20 November 1925
 14–1, Galatasaray – Anadolu Üsküdar 1908, 1914–1915, Istanbul Lig, 18 December 1914
 12–1, Galatasaray – Topkapı SK, 1936–1937, Istanbul Lig, 27 December 1936
 11–0, Galatasaray – Moda-Imogene Muhteliti, 1909–1910, Istanbul Lig, 21 January 1909
 11–0, Galatasaray – UnkapanıFK, 1941–1942, Kupası, 21 December 1941
 11–1, Galatasaray – Haliç İdman Yurdu, 1943–1944, Istanbul Kupası, 28 November 1943
 10–0, Galatasaray – Süleymaniye SK, 1934–1935, Federasyon Kupası, 16 November 1934
 10–0, Galatasaray – Üsküdar Anadolu SK, 1957–1958, Federasyon Kupası, 16 November 1957

Unbeaten
Longest unbeaten run in domestic league

Longest unbeaten run (at home) in domestic league

Longest unbeaten run (away) in domestic league

 Longest unbeaten club in a single season
 36 games in 1985–86 season

Goals
Most goals in a Süper Lig season

Most goals in a season – all competitions

Türkiye Kupası

Wins
Most wins in a Türkiye Kupası season

Most consecutive wins

Record Wins
 1–9, FBM Yaşamspor – Galatasaray, 2014–2015, 16 December 2014
 7–0, Galatasaray – Kastamonuspor 1966, 2022–2023, 19 October 2022
 7–0, Galatasaray – Eskişehir Demirspor, 1975–1976, 7 January 1976
 7–0, Galatasaray – Vanspor, 2000–2001, 29 November 2000
 6–0, Galatasaray – Karşıyaka, 1962–1963, 26 December 1962
 6–0, Galatasaray – Adana Milli Mensucat SK, 1967–1968, 1 November 1967
 6–0, Galatasaray – Beşiktaş, 18 July 1997

Unbeaten
Longest unbeaten run at Türkiye Kupası

Longest unbeaten run (at home) at Türkiye Kupası

Longest unbeaten run (away) at Türkiye Kupası

Goals
Most goals in a Türkiye Kupası season

International
 First and only Turkish team to have won a European competition trophy
 Galatasaray has won the UEFA Cup and UEFA Super Cup in 2000
 Highest win in European competitions at home matches
 6–0 over Maccabi Netanya F.C. in 2009–10 UEFA Europa League season
 Highest win in European competitions at away matches
 1–5 over Avenir Beggen in 1994 and over OFK Belgrad in 2010.
 Longest unbeaten run in European competitions
 15 matches between 26 October 1999 to 12 September 2000 (includes also the UEFA Cup Final and UEFA Super Cup matches in 2000)
 First and only Turkish team to have qualified for FIFA Club World Cup.
 2001 FIFA Club World Cup, however the tournament was cancelled by FIFA to due financial reasons.
 First and only Turkish team to end in runner-up position of IFFHS World's Best Club ranking.
 In year 2000, Galatasaray ended secondly at the ranking after Real Madrid.

Player records

Appearance

Most appearances
Competitive matches only.

Süper Lig most appearances

All-time most appearance (including friendlies)

Youngest first-team player
Competitive matches only.

Oldest first-team player
Competitive matches only.

One-club men
Since the foundation of Galatasaray in 1905 there have been 23 players who have played their entire professional career Galatasaray SK.
The first players to play at least 10 years just for Galatasaray were Celal İbrahim, Ahmet Robenson and Bekir Sıtkı Bircan who were also one of the founding members.

Goalscorers
Competitive matches only. Matches played, including as substitute, appear in brackets.

All-time leading goalscorers

Including friendlies and other tournaments (al least 100 goals)

Galatasaray overall topscorers by season
Here is a list of players who have finished as the club top scorers for Galatasaray by season.
(Competitive matches only.)

Overview

Most goals scored in one season (all competitions) for the club
47, Metin Oktay (1962-1963)
46, Tanju Çolak (1987-1988)
46, Hakan Şükür (1996-1997)
Most goals scored in a Süper Lig season
39, Tanju Çolak (1987-1988)
38, Metin Oktay (1962-1963)
38, Hakan Şükür (1996-1997)
36, Metin Oktay (1960-1961)
33, Metin Oktay (1959-1960)
32, Hakan Şükür (1997-1998)
31, Tanju Çolak (1990-1991)
30, Cemil Erlertürk (1939-1940)
Most goals scored in a single Turkish Cup season
10, Lukas Podolski (2016-2017)
Most goals scored in a European Cup season
10, Hakan Şükür (1999–2000)

Scorers at Türkiye Kupası

Youngest first-team goalscorer
Competitive matches only.

Oldest first-team goalscorer
Competitive matches only.

Highest scorer in a single game

Hat-tricks
Competitive matches only.

Award winners
Several players have won individual and international honours whilst on the books of Galatasaray:

European Golden Boot
 Tanju Çolak – 1987–88

FIFA 100
 Emre Belözoğlu
 Gheorghe Hagi

The 100 Greatest Players of the 20th century
 Gheorghe Hagi – #25

UEFA Jubilee Awards (Golden Players)
 Gheorghe Hagi
 Hakan Şükür

Golden Foot
 Didier Drogba – 2013

Trophies
Galatasaray players having won the most trophies.
Official competitions only.
Active players in bold.

Transfers

Highest transfer fees paid

Highest transfer fees received

Manager records

 Most seasons: 14 –  Fatih Terim (1996–00, 2002–04, 2011–13, 2017–2022)
 Most consecutive seasons: 5 –  Fatih Terim (2017–2022)
 Most competitive matches: 558 –  Fatih Terim
 Most matches in international club competitions: 93 –  Fatih Terim
 Most titles: 17 –  Fatih Terim
 Most titles in a season: 3 –  Fatih Terim (1999–00)
 Most league titles: 8 –  Fatih Terim
 Most consecutive league titles: 4 –  Fatih Terim (1996–00)
 Most Türkiye Kupası titles: 3 –  Fatih Terim,  Gündüz Kılıç
 Most TFF Süper Kupa titles: 5 –  Fatih Terim
 Most international club competition titles: 1 –  Fatih Terim,  Mircea Lucescu
 Most doubles: 3 –  Fatih Terim (Süper Lig and Türkiye Kupası) (1998–99, 1999–00, 2018–19)
 Highest win percentage (at least one season in charge): 72.37% –  Gündüz Kılıç (1954–57)
 Lowest win percentage (at least one season in charge): 31.71% –  Malcolm Allison (1976–77)

Attendances

Records

Season tickets and average attendance

See also
Football records and statistics in Turkey
List of Süper Lig top scorers
European association football club records and statistics

References

Galatasaray S.K. (men's football)